The Richard Vaughan Badminton Academy (RVBA)  is made up of an elite group of young Welsh badminton players. It is a centre excellence for badminton in Wales, and specifically badminton in Cardiff. The founder and head coach is Double Olympian Richard Vaughan who is based in Cardiff, Wales.

The RVBA is directed by double Olympian and former world number 7 Richard Vaughan from Wales. Richard is supported by former Irish Olympic Coach Donal O Halloran, former World Number 32 Dr Piret Vaughan,  former top British junior Liam Ingram and Top Scottish player Alistair Casey. Top Sports Physio Leon Vaughan MSc provides physio support in the form of injury prevention programmes based around core stability exercises, in addition to the treatment of injuries.

The Academy was an idea of between Richard Vaughan and his first coach Don Griffiths, to help young Badminton players achieve their goals.

Richard Vaughan commented "We share the same vision of helping young talent develop to produce British Olympians of the future to follow in my footsteps. I have had many successes as a professional Badminton player and I feel the time has come to start to pass on my knowledge and experience in addition to young British talent."

Most notable RVBA results to date include Sarah Thomas, and Tim Stranks won the  British u17 Championships in January 2009. Sarah Thomas won the Welsh Senior Nationals at the age of sixteen.
Richard Vaughan and Sarah Thomas topped the European Mixed Circuit Rankings in September 2009.

The RVBA has forged many links with numerous partners, and supporters.
In June 2006 it announced a 5-year partnership with Memory Lane Cakes (Finsbury Food Group) based in Cardiff with the aim of providing the funds to secure coach resources and fund tournament participation in the buildup to the London 2012 Olympics.
Other local business supporters includes FD Systems and Accounting Software Direct.

The RVBA has a great relationship with Caerphilly County Borough Council (CCBC), and uses a CCBC facility, St Cenydd Leisure Centre for its training sessions.
Catalan Badminton have been another long standing supporter which has enabled player exchanges by between Catalan Badminton and the RVBA.

Top racket manufacturer "Head" has been a long-time supporter to both Richard Vaughan, and the RVBA.

External links
 http://www.rvba.co.uk/pages/rvba.html
 https://web.archive.org/web/20081014081104/http://www.welshbadminton.net/
 http://www.buckleybc.org.uk

References

Badminton in Wales
Sports academies